Remyra Idrettslag is a Norwegian football and handball club from Stjørdal, Nord-Trøndelag.

The club was founded in 1979. The men's football team currently plays in the 6. Divisjon, the seventh tier of Norwegian football. It had a single-season stint in the 3. divisjon in 2010. Professional footballer Are Tronseth started his career there.

References

Official site 

Football clubs in Norway
Association football clubs established in 1979
Sport in Trøndelag
Stjørdal
1979 establishments in Norway